General Stevenson (1875–1961) was an English footballer who played as a right back, notably for Liverpool and Millwall.

Born in Padiham, west of Burnley, Stevenson began his career in 1893 with the amateur side Hapton. He moved onto Padiham two years later before Liverpool bought him in August 1898. Stevenson debuted for Liverpool in November, away to Nottingham Forest, but made just 23 appearances in the two seasons he spent with the club. He left in 1900 for Barnsley, playing 54 times until transferring to Millwall in 1903. Stevenson established himself as a popular regular for Millwall, becoming team captain and making 318 appearances, scoring nine goals.

Stevenson guided the club to three titles: the London League in 1904 and the Western League in 1908 and 1909. Additionally, Stevenson won the Southern Professional Charity Cup in 1904. His benefit match against Northampton Town in 1909 attracted a crowd of 10,000. He became a pub landlord in retirement. His son, Arthur Stevenson, was a professional rugby league footballer for Wigan. and footballer for Sheffield United and Middlesbrough.

Notes

References
Matthews, Tony (2006) Who's Who of Liverpool, Mainstream Publishing,

External links
 LFC History profile

1875 births
1945 deaths
People from Padiham
English footballers
Padiham F.C. players
Liverpool F.C. players
Barnsley F.C. players
Wellingborough Town F.C. players
Millwall F.C. players
Accrington Stanley F.C. (1891) players
English Football League players
Association football fullbacks
Footballers from Lancashire